Temerloh District is a district in Pahang, Malaysia. The district consists of two areas, the  Municipal Council Area (64.08%) and the  outer Municipal Council Area (35.92%). Temerloh district is bordered by Maran District on the east, Bentong District on the west, Jerantut District on the north, and Bera District on the south.

Demographics

The following is based on Department of Statistics Malaysia 2016 census.

Federal Parliament and State Assembly Seats

List of Temerloh district representatives in the Federal Parliament (Dewan Rakyat) 

List of Temerloh district representatives in the State Legislative Assembly (Dewan Undangan Negeri) 

Note: Jengka (N29) state constituency is located in the district of Maran.

Subdistricts

Temerloh has 10 mukim or subdistricts.

District Officer
The current district officer of Temerloh is Dato' Mohd Fadzli bin Mohd Kenali.

See also
 Districts of Malaysia

References

External links 
Official website of Temerloh Municipal Council